The Puerto Rico women's national under-18 and under-19 basketball team, is controlled by the Puerto Rican Basketball Federation, abbreviated as FBPUR, and represents Puerto Rico in international under-18 and under-19 (under age 18 and under age 19) women's basketball competitions.

See also
 Puerto Rico national basketball team
 Puerto Rico national under-19 basketball team
 Puerto Rico women's national basketball team

References

External links
 Puerto Rico Basketball Federation

Women's national under-19 basketball teams
Basketball